James Rhodes is a Marvel Comics character that has appeared in comics featuring or related to Iron Man since 1979. The character has appeared in other media adaptations of Iron Man both as a non-costumed character and as War Machine.

Most of the character's appearances have been in animation, but in the Marvel Cinematic Universe, the character is played successively by Terrence Howard and Don Cheadle.

Television

Animation

1990s

 War Machine appeared in Iron Man, voiced by James Avery for most of season one and Dorian Harewood for the remainder of the series. During season one, War Machine served as a member of Force Works before the team disbands in season two, though War Machine remains by Iron Man's side. Throughout the series, War Machine grapples with his claustrophobia arising from almost drowning in his armor.
 War Machine makes cameo appearances in the X-Men episodes "Time Fugitives Saga" and "The Dark Phoenix Saga".
 War Machine appears in the Spider-Man episodes "Venom Returns" and "Carnage", voiced again by James Avery.
 War Machine appears in The Incredible Hulk "Helping Hand, Iron Fist", voiced again by Dorian Harewood.

2000s
 A teenage incarnation of James "Rhodey" Rhodes appears as a main character in Iron Man: Armored Adventures, voiced by Daniel Bacon. This version is Tony Stark's best friend and a student at the Tomorrow Academy. During season one, Rhodes and his family take in Tony after Howard Stark's apparent death. Rhodes serves as Iron Man's tactical aide-de-campe and voice of reason before receiving the War Machine armor.
 War Machine appears in The Super Hero Squad Show episode "Tales of Suspense!", voiced by LeVar Burton.

2010s
 James Rhodes appears in The Avengers: Earth's Mightiest Heroes, voiced by Bumper Robinson. This version initially appears as an associate of Iron Man's in season one before utilizing the War Machine armor and becoming a founding member of the New Avengers in season two.
 James Rhodes appears in Marvel Disk Wars: The Avengers, voiced by Hidenori Takahashi in Japanese and Keith Silverstein in English.

2020s
Don Cheadle voices an alternate timeline version of the MCU incarnation of James "Rhodey" Rhodes in the Disney+ series What If? episode "What If... Killmonger Rescued Tony Stark?", with  reprising his role.

Live-action
 Don Cheadle reprises his role as the MCU incarnation of James "Rhodey" Rhodes in the Disney+ miniseries The Falcon and the Winter Soldier episode "New World Order". For his performance, Cheadle was nominated for an Emmy Award for Outstanding Guest Actor in a Drama Series.

Film

Animated
 James Rhodes appears in the 2007 animated film The Invincible Iron Man, voiced by Rodney Saulsberry. This version is an engineer and former army medic.
 War Machine appears in the anime film Iron Man: Rise of Technovore, voiced by James C. Mathis III in the English version and Hiroki Yasumoto in the Japanese version.
 War Machine appears in the anime film Avengers Confidential: Black Widow & Punisher.

Live-action

James "Rhodey" Rhodes appears in films set in the Marvel Cinematic Universe, portrayed initially by Terrence Howard and subsequently by Don Cheadle following a contract dispute between the former and Marvel Studios. Cheadle is expected to headline the MCU film Armor Wars.

Video games
 War Machine and a golden "hidden" version appears as a playable character in Marvel vs. Capcom: Clash of Super Heroes, voiced by Wayne Ward.
 War Machine appears as a playable character in Marvel vs. Capcom 2: New Age of Heroes, voiced again by Wayne Ward.
 War Machine's armor appears as an alternate costume for Iron Man in X-Men Legends II: Rise of Apocalypse.
 War Machine's armor appears as an alternate costume for Iron Man in most versions of Marvel: Ultimate Alliance and as a playable character in the PC version.
 James Rhodes appears in the Iron Man film tie-in game, voiced by Terrence Howard.
 War Machine appears as a boss for the Anti-Registration campaign in the PlayStation 3 and Xbox 360 versions of Marvel: Ultimate Alliance 2, voiced by Nolan North.
 War Machine appears as a playable character in the Iron Man 2 film tie-in game, voiced by Don Cheadle, with additional dialogue provided by Phil LaMarr.
 War Machine appears as a playable character in Marvel vs. Capcom 3: Fate of Two Worlds and its subsequent update Ultimate Marvel vs Capcom 3. Additionally, he makes a cameo appearance in Hawkeye's ending in the latter game as a member of the West Coast Avengers.
 War Machine appears as a playable character in Marvel Super Hero Squad Online, voiced by Alimi Ballard.
 War Machine appears in Iron Man 3: The Official Game, voiced by Ty Jones.
 War Machine appears as a playable character in Marvel: Avengers Alliance.
 War Machine appears as a playable character in Lego Marvel Super Heroes, voiced again by Phil LaMarr.
 War Machine appears as a playable character in Marvel Heroes, again voiced by James C. Mathis III.
 War Machine appears as a playable character in Marvel: Contest of Champions.
 War Machine appears as a playable character in Marvel: Future Fight.
 A teenage version of War Machine appears in Marvel Avengers Academy, voiced by Adande Thorne.
 War Machine appears as a playable character in Lego Marvel's Avengers, voiced again by Don Cheadle.
 War Machine appears as a playable character in Lego Marvel Super Heroes 2.

References